The 1985 Kentucky Derby was the 111th running of the Kentucky Derby. The race took place on May 4, 1985, with 108,573 people in attendance.

Full results

Payout

References

1985
Kentucky Derby
Derby
Kentucky
Kentucky Derby